The Italian railway system is one of the most important parts of the infrastructure of Italy, with a total length of  of which active lines are 16,723 km. The network has recently grown with the construction of the new high-speed rail network. Italy is a member of the International Union of Railways (UIC). The UIC Country Code for Italy is 83.

The network

RFI (Rete Ferroviaria Italiana, Italian Rail Network), a state owned infrastructure manager which administers most of the Italian rail infrastructure. Lines are divided into 3 categories: 
fundamental lines (fondamentali), which have high traffic and good infrastructure quality, comprise all the main lines between major cities throughout the country.
complementary lines (complementari), which have less traffic and are responsible for connecting medium or small regional centers. Most of these lines are single track and some are not electrified;
node lines (di nodo), which link complementary and fundamental lines near metropolitan areas for a total .

Most of the Italian network is electrified. Electric system is 3 kV DC on conventional lines and 25 kV AC on high-speed lines.

The Italian rail network comprises also other minor regional lines controlled by other companies, such as Ferrovie Emilia Romagna and Ferrovie del Sud Est, for a total of

History 

The first railway in Italy was the Napoli-Portici line, built in 1839 to connect the royal palace of Naples to the seaside. After the creation of the Kingdom of Italy in 1861, a project was started to build a network from the Alps to Sicily, in order to connect the country.

With this service, the railway was able to compete with the upcoming airplanes. The Second World War stopped these services.

Nowadays the rail tracks and infrastructure are managed by Rete Ferroviaria Italiana (RFI), while the train and the passenger section is managed mostly by Trenitalia. Both are Ferrovie dello Stato (FS) subsidiaries, once the only train operator in Italy.

High-speed rail

High-speed trains were developed during the 1960s. The braking systems of cars were updated to match the increased travelling speeds.

On 25 June 1970, work was started on the Rome–Florence Direttissima, the first high-speed line in Italy. It included the  bridge on the Paglia river, then the longest in Europe. Works were completed in the early 1990s.

In 1975, a program for a widespread updating of the rolling stock was launched. However, as it was decided to put more emphasis on local traffic, this caused a shifting of resources from the ongoing high-speed projects, with their subsequent slowing or, in some cases, total abandonment. Therefore, 160 E.656 electric and 35 D.345 locomotives for short-medium range traffic were acquired, together with 80 EMUs of the ALe 801/940 class, 120 ALn 668 diesel railcars. Some 1,000 much-needed passenger and 7,000 freight cars were also ordered.

In the 1990s, work started on the Treno Alta Velocità (TAV) project, which involved building a new high-speed network on the routes Milan – (Bologna–Florence–Rome–Naples) – Salerno, Turin – (Milan–Verona–Venice) – Trieste and Milan–Genoa. Most of the planned lines have already been opened, while international links with France, Switzerland, Austria and Slovenia are underway.

Most of the Rome–Naples line opened in December 2005, the Turin–Milan line partially opened in February 2006 and the Milan–Bologna line opened in December 2008. The remaining sections of the Rome–Naples and the Turin–Milan lines and the Bologna–Florence line were completed in December 2009.

Other proposed high-speed lines are Salerno-Reggio Calabria, then connected to Sicily, and Naples-Bari.

Rail links to adjacent countries 
All links have the same gauge.
  Austria  — voltage change 3 kV DC/15 kV AC
  France — voltage change 3 kV DC/25 kV AC or 1.5 kV DC
  Slovenia — same voltage
  Switzerland — voltage change 3 kV DC/15 kV AC (plus two narrow gauge lines, same voltage)
  Vatican City — no electrification
  San Marino — closed, narrow gauge
Stations on the border are:
Roma San Pietro is the border station of the Rome-Vatican City railway
Ventimiglia is the border station on the Genoa-Nice main line.
Olivetta San Michele and Limone Piemonte on both sides of the Tenda Railway
Modane is the border station on the Turin-Lyon main line (Fréjus Tunnel line).
Domodossola is the border station of the Milan-Bern/Geneva main line (Simplon Tunnel line).
Ribellasca is on the Vigezzina.
Luino is the border station of the Oleggio–Pino railway.
Chiasso is the border station of the Milan-Zürich main line (Gotthard Tunnel line).
Tirano is the terminus on the Italian side of the  Bernina line of the Rhätische Bahn.
Brenner is the border station of the Verona-Innsbruck main line (Brenner railway).
San Candido is the border station of the Fortezza-Lienz secondary line.
Tarvisio Boscoverde is the border station of the Venezia-Wien main line (Austrian Southern Railway line).
Gorizia Centrale station serves as link to the Slovenian Railways, through the station of Nova Gorica, which can be entered also directly by pedestrians from the Italian side.
Villa Opicina (Villa Opicina, Trieste) serves as link to the Slovenian Railways, through the stations of Sežana and Repentabor.

Subsidies 
The Italian railways are partially funded by the government, receiving €8.1 billion of rail subsidies in 2009.

Categories and types of trains
These are the major service categories and models of Italian trains.

Main stations

See also

Ferrovie dello Stato Italiane
Railway stations in Italy
Transport in Italy
Trenitalia
Treno Alta Velocità
Rail transport in Europe

References

Bibliography

External links

 RFI (Infrastructure manager) Official website (Italian only)
 Lyon Turin Ferroviaire
 Railway Technology.com article on Italian High Speed Rail, including NTV, Accessed 5 February 2008
 Italian HS System